Arthur Jasmine (April 4, 1899 in St. Paul, Minnesota – August 19, 1954 in Los Angeles, California) was an American film actor.

Biography
Jasmine began his career as a child actor at Essanay Studios in Niles, California.  He appeared in 22 films between years 1915 and 1925 most notably in Alla Nazimova's Salomé (1923).

Selected filmography
Features:
The Man in the Moonlight (1919)
 Common Property (1919)
 Lasca (1919)
A Tokyo Siren (1920)
The Fire Cat (1921)
 Thunder Island (1921)
The Son of the Wolf (1922)
The Ninety and Nine (1922)
Salomé (1923)
Scaramouche (1923)
Lure of the Yukon (1924)
 Justice of the Far North (1925)
After Marriage (1925)
Short Subjects:
Versus Sledge Hammers (1915)
Broncho Billy's Parents (1915)
When Snakeville Struck Oil (1915)
The Night That Sophie Graduated (1915)
Too Much Turkey (1915)
It Happened in Snakeville (1915)
A Christmas Revenge (1915)
The Man in Him (1916)
A Waiting Game (1916)

External links

1899 births
1954 deaths
American male film actors
American male silent film actors
20th-century American male actors